"Cât poți tu de tare" (As hard as you can) is the fourth single by B.U.G. Mafia from their ninth studio album, Înapoi În Viitor (Back To The Future). It was released on YouTube and the group's official website on December 31, 2010. The song is produced by Tataee and mixed by Cristi Dobrica. Kickboxer Daniel Ghiță appeared in the video.

Background 
The track was recorded by the group in 2010 and was released as a free music download on New Year's Eve. Produced by Tataee, it was recorded in Bucharest at the Ines Sound & Video studios by longtime collaborator Cristi Dobrică. Rock vocalist Bogdan "Bodo" Marin is featured on the chorus.

Content 
"Cât Poți Tu De Tare" is a motivational song urging anyone listening to take advantage of their talent and not be influenced by people's critics.

Track listing 
 Digital single

References

External links
 B.U.G Mafia official webpage
 Official Facebook Page
 

2010 singles
2010 songs
B.U.G. Mafia songs
Songs written by Tataee